Bill Poni Tuiloma (born 27 March 1995) is a New Zealand professional footballer who plays as a centre-back or defensive midfielder for Charlotte FC in Major League Soccer.

Tuiloma has represented New Zealand internationally since 2013, and was the first New Zealander to play in Ligue 1, the highest division of French football.

Early life
Born in Beach Haven, New Zealand, Tuiloma is of Samoan descent. He attended Birkenhead College and Lincoln High School.  He was part of the first intake of players to be invited to the Asia Pacific Football Academy which worked with Chelsea FC.

Club career

Marseille
Following trials with LA Galaxy and Queens Park Rangers, Tuiloma signed a deal with French side Olympique de Marseille in July 2013. In a 2013 interview, he was questioned about his journey from relative football obscurity to his eventual move to Marseille.

He also admitted that Queens Park Rangers and Wellington Phoenix were also interested in signing him if the Marseille deal fell through.

Tuiloma made his first-team debut for the club on 7 February 2015, when he came on as a late substitute for Florian Thauvin in a 2–2 draw with Rennes. Upon making his debut he became the first New Zealander ever to play in Ligue 1. It was one of only two senior appearances he made, however, before signing on loan for Strasbourg for the 2015–16 season, and then permanently for Portland Timbers in 2017.

Portland Timbers
On 25 July 2017, Tuiloma officially signed with MLS side Portland Timbers. He made three appearances with Portland Timbers 2 in 2017, and made his first-team debut on 24 March 2018, in a 1–1 draw with FC Dallas. The Timbers resigned Tuiloma on 24 January 2018.

International career
Tuiloma represented New Zealand under-17 at the 2011 FIFA U-17 World Cup and New Zealand under-20, for whom he was also the captain, at the 2013 and 2015 FIFA U-20 World Cups.

He made his senior international debut for New Zealand on 15 October 2013, at the age of 18, when he came on as a substitute in a 0–0 draw with Trinidad and Tobago in Port of Spain.

Career statistics

Club

International

International goals

Honours
Waitakere United
 New Zealand Football Championship: 2011–12

Strasbourg
 Championnat National: 2015–16

Portland Timbers
 MLS is Back Tournament: 2020

New Zealand
 OFC Nations Cup: 2016
 OFC U-20 Championship: 2013
 OFC U-17 Championship: 2011

References

External links
 

1995 births
Living people
Samoan footballers
Association football defenders
New Zealand association footballers
New Zealand international footballers
New Zealand sportspeople of Samoan descent
New Zealand under-20 international footballers
Olympique de Marseille players
People educated at Lincoln High School, New Zealand
Charlotte FC players
Portland Timbers 2 players
Portland Timbers players
USL Championship players
Waitakere United players
2016 OFC Nations Cup players
2017 FIFA Confederations Cup players
Expatriate soccer players in the United States
Expatriate footballers in France
New Zealand expatriate sportspeople in the United States
New Zealand expatriate sportspeople in France
Ligue 1 players
Major League Soccer players
Birkenhead United AFC players
Association footballers from Auckland
RC Strasbourg Alsace players
People from North Shore, New Zealand
New Zealand under-23 international footballers